The men's 20 kilometres walk at the 2022 World Athletics Championships was held on a 1 kilometer loop course on Martin Luther King Jr. Blvd. adjacent to Autzen Stadium in Eugene on 15 July 2022.

Summary
David Kenny broke from the start to take the early lead.  After a couple hundred metres in the spotlight, Toshikazu Yamanishi went by en route to a 3:55 first kilometer.  With a 4 second lead, Yamanishi saw nobody was willing to go with him.  He remained in the lead for three laps before easing off the accelerator.  Perseus Karlström was next to take the point with a pack of 22 staying close together.  On the eighth lap, César Augusto Rodríguez asserted himself into the lead, then Yamanishi took over.  Just after the halfway mark, Yamanishi dropped a 3:51 lap and continued the pressure, the pack dwindled to 9, then 7 as the third 5K was covered in 19:24.  Karlström again pushed to the front but couldn't hold the lead, falling off the pace.  With four laps to go, it was down to three leaders, Yamanishi, his encouraging teammate Koki Ikeda and Kenyan Samuel Gathimba.  With two to go, Ikeda edged ahead but that was temporary.  Yamanishi edged back ahead, the on his final lap dropped a 3:41 to separate from his teammate Ikeda.  With his final lap, Karlström matched the 3:41 to come back and pass Gathimba for the bronze.

Records
Before the competition records were as follows:

Qualification standard
The standard to qualify automatically for entry was 1:21:00.

Schedule
The event schedule, in local time (UTC−7), was as follows:

Results 
The race was started on 15 July at 15:09.

References

20 km walk
Racewalking at the World Athletics Championships